Lida Fariman (born 10 July 1972) is an Iranian sports shooter. She was born in Tabriz. She competed in the women's 10 metre air rifle event at the 1996 Summer Olympics.

References

1972 births
Living people
Iranian female sport shooters
Olympic shooters of Iran
Shooters at the 1996 Summer Olympics
Place of birth missing (living people)
Asian Games bronze medalists for Iran
Asian Games medalists in shooting
Shooters at the 1994 Asian Games
Shooters at the 1998 Asian Games
Shooters at the 2002 Asian Games
Medalists at the 2002 Asian Games
20th-century Iranian women
21st-century Iranian women